Siu haau sauce is the primary barbecue sauce used in Cantonese cuisine. It generally contains garlic, honey, palm sugar, five spice powder, and pepper.

Siu haau is used during the barbecue-cooking process as opposed to a flavoring sauce after the food is made. It is not used for siu mei rotisserie-style cooking; dishes such as char siu each have their own sauce.

See also

 Shacha sauce
 List of Chinese sauces
 List of sauces

References

External links
Siu haau sauce photo

Chinese condiments
Barbecue sauces
Chinese sauces